Nick Ruth is an American record producer and songwriter based in Los Angeles. He has produced and written for artists such as Kelly Clarkson, Nick Jonas, Ellie Goulding, Wiz Khalifa, Carly Rae Jepsen, Andy Grammer, Mikky Ekko, and more.

Discography

External links
Allmusic.com
Management website

References

Living people
Record producers from Los Angeles
Year of birth missing (living people)